Sarah Rush is an American actress, best known in television for her work in the original Battlestar Galactica.  She narrated and starred in the 2005 documentary The Bituminous Coal Queens of Pennsylvania produced by Patricia Heaton and directed by David Hunt, which won the 2006 Heartland Film Festival Award. Rush was herself crowned Coal Queen in 1972.

Sarah Kathleen Rush was born on September 20, 1955 in Waynesburg, PA and graduated from Waynesburg Central High School in Waynesburg, PA in 1973. She is a member of the Actors Studio, an acting student of Uta Hagen and Milton Katselas, and is a BFA in Theatre summa cum laude graduate from the Pennsylvania State University.  She was married to Fred Bova and has one daughter, Amanda Grace from her previous marriage.

Theatre
Our Town directed by Gower Champion and also starring Eddie Albert,
As You Like It directed by Sir Tony Richardson and also starring Stockard Channing,
The Glass Menagerie directed by Lee Shallot,
Toyer at the Kennedy Center directed by Sir Tony Richardson and also starring Kathleen Turner, Brad Davis, and Kevin Spacey,
She Stoops to Conquer in the title role,
 The Belle of Amherst, a one-woman show on the life of Emily Dickinson,
 Alma in Summer and Smoke,
 Angel in When You Comin' Back, Red Ryder? starring Christopher McDonald.

Television
The Incredible Hulk (1978) — Young Woman (1 episode)
Dr. Strange (1978) — Nurse (1 episode)
Sword of Justice (1978) — Cathy (1 episode)
Battlestar Galactica (1978–1979) — Flight Cpl. Rigel (11 episodes)
Happy Days (1979) — Fern (1 episode) (episode "Fonzie and the She-Devils")
The Seekers (1979) — Amanda Kent
Roughecks (1980) — Carol McBride
Quincy, M.E. (1978–1980) — Trish Granby, Dr. Harriett Bowlin (3 episodes)
Modesty Blaise (1982) — Emma Woodhouse
For Love of Angela (1982) — Angela Tanner
Bret Maverick (1982) — Princess Athena (1 episode)
Tales from the Darkside (1986) — Laura Burns (1 episode)
Monty — Psychic (1 episode)
Crossroads Cafe (1996) — Anna Brashov (2 episodes)
Everybody Loves Raymond (1998) — Woman (1 episode)
Chicken Soup for the Soul (2000) — Mrs. Calloway (1 episode)
Friends (2002) — Nurse #3 (1 episode)
The Megan Mullally Show (2006) — Herself (1 episode)
Monk (2009) — Nurse Judy Fitzgerald (1 episode)

Filmography
Joni (1979) — Kathy Eareckson
The Nude Bomb (1980) — Pam Krovney
Years of the Beast (1981) — Cindy
The Prodigal (1983) — Laura
Talking to Strangers (1988) — Potter
Fangs (2001) — Lois Bostwick
Max Keeble's Big Move (2001) — Ms. Lane
Destiny (2002) — Diane
Catch Me If You Can (2002) — Secretary
Legally Blonde 2: Red, White & Blonde (2003)
The Bituminous Coal Queens of Pennsylvania (2005) — Narrator

References

External links 
 
 
 
   Sarah Rush Website  

1955 births
 American film actresses
 American stage actresses
 American television actresses
Living people
20th-century American actresses
21st-century American actresses